Ufuk Akyol (born 27 August 1997) is a German professional footballer who plays as a defender for Süper Lig club Antalyaspor.

Career
Akyol is a youth product of the academies of the German clubs Stuttgart and Heidenheim. He moved to the Turkish club Fatih Karagümrük on 22 April 2016, signing a professional contract. He made his professional debut in a 1-0 Süper Lig win over Göztepe S.K. on 18 August 2019. On 13 May 2019, he transferred to Antalyaspor after 3 seasons with Fatih Karagümrük.

International career
Born in Germany, Akyol is of Turkish descent. He is a youth international for Germany, having played for the Germany U16s and Germany U17s. He has expressed an interest in playing for the Turkey national team.

References

External links
 
 TFF Profile
 Mackolik Profile
 DFB Profile

1997 births
Living people
People from Ravensburg
Sportspeople from Tübingen (region)
German footballers
Germany youth international footballers
German people of Turkish descent
Association football midfielders
Fatih Karagümrük S.K. footballers
Antalyaspor footballers
Süper Lig players
TFF Second League players
Footballers from Baden-Württemberg
21st-century German people